Konstantinos Theofylaktos (born in Trapezunta), was a banker and mayor of Trabzon, Turkey from 1916 until 1918. He was the owner of Kostaki Mansion built between 1889-1913 as a large family accommodation, which is reorganised as the Trabzon Museum.

References

External links
 Theofylaktos biography

Mayors of Trabzon
Year of birth missing
Year of death missing
Pontic Greeks